Paibok the Power Skrull is a supervillain appearing in American comic books published by Marvel Comics. He is a foe of the Fantastic Four.

Publication history

Paibok's first appearance was in Fantastic Four #358 (November 1991); he was created by Tom DeFalco, Paul Ryan and Danny Bulanadi.

Fictional character biography
Paibok was born on the planet Tarnax IV, in the Tarnax System in the Andromeda Galaxy. His home planet was part of the Skrull Empire, but has since been destroyed. Paibok was trained at the Skrullian military academy, and became a Skrull espionage agent, and a captain in the Skrull armed forces.

Lyja and Alicia
The Skrull Empire seeks a way to defeat the Fantastic Four, who have handed them multiple defeats. Paibok suggests a subtle plan: replacing the Fantastic Four's associate Alicia Masters with Lyja, a Skrull spy and Paibok's former lover. Their relationship had not ended well.

Lyja successfully impersonates Alicia and the real Alicia is held prisoner by Paibok.

Eventually the Fantastic Four realize what had happened and come in search of Alicia. They confront Paibok on 'War World'. Paibok, now calling himself the "Power Skrull" after being augmented in a manner similar to the Super-Skrull, is prepared for the encounter and almost defeats the Fantastic Four and Lyja.

Lyja seemingly sacrifices her life to protect the Human Torch and the Thing finally defeats Paibok. He is left for dead, buried under fallen rubble.

The Fearsome Foursome
Paibok survived the battle and recovered Lyja's body. Seeking revenge on the Fantastic Four, he encountered Devos the Devastator, another alien who had clashed with them, and the two formed an alliance. Devos was able to revive Lyja, and Paibok and Devos altered Lyja's genetic structure, granting her the power of flight and the ability to project lethal energy blasts. Together, the three traveled to Earth to battle the Fantastic Four again.

Arriving on earth, they isolated and attacked the Human Torch in New York City, forcing him to use his Nova Flame against them — a move which then led to his arrest for damage to the surroundings. A second attack confused and aggravated the situation, leaving the Human Torch a fugitive from the police. Alongside Devos and Lyja, Paibok witnessed the battle between the Fantastic Four and an alternate Fantastic Four. Paibok was betrayed by Lyja when she again joined the conflict and abandoned Paibok and sided with the Fantastic Four. Alongside Devos, Paibok attacked the Human Torch during his trial.

Undeterred, Paibok and Devos recruited new allies — Klaw and Huntara — and the quartet continued their attacks on the Fantastic Four, becoming known as the Fearsome Foursome. Eventually they were able to capture their foes (including Lyja) and returned to the Skrull Throneworld to present the captives to the Empress.

Paibok's triumph was short-lived, though — once on Throneworld he discovered that Devos was a wanted criminal, a renegade with a price on his head and an entire world under his command. Devos promptly summoned his troops, took personal command of his flagship (the Death Cruiser) and attempted to destroy Throneworld. The Empress blamed Paibok for this and repaid him by ordering his death.

Seeking to redeem himself, Paibok made his way on board the Death Cruiser and confronted Devos. The ship's stardrive was damaged during their confrontation and the cruiser fell into subspace — Devos and Paibok were both believed lost along with the ship.

Freakshow
Paibok somehow escaped from subspace and struck a deal with Centaurian scientists to enhance his powers. Their treatment succeeded — but also affected his appearance, leaving him in a cadaverous, zombie-like form. Still viewed as a traitor, he fled to Earth and assembled a band of Skrull renegades.

Disguised as Paul Balk, the owner of a traveling freakshow, Paibok located and tried to capture an immature Watcher, a plan that led to clashes with the Thing and a band of Kree. The attempt failed and he was captured by the Kree, who left Earth shortly afterwards with Paibok as their prisoner.

Earthfall
It is not known how Paibok was transferred out of Kree custody, but he was next seen as one of the few convicts to survive when the prison transport vessel Dredge 01 crashed on its way to Kyln. Paibok's appearance had, without explanation, been reverted to that of a typical Skrull. The prison ship crashed on Earth, near the town of Coot's Bluff in Alaska, and Paibok immediately took command of the other survivors (Lunatik and the Blood Brothers) in an attempt to salvage the wrecked ship's technology and escape the planet. Paibok's plan also involved taking control of Coot's Bluff and using the terrified population as slave labor — something which brought his renegades into conflict with the only other survivor of the crash, Drax the Destroyer.

Initially, Paibok and his allies defeated Drax, leaving him for dead. However, Drax somehow recovered — and then hunted down his attackers, killing Lunatik and one of the Blood Brothers. Paibok's escape plan was abandoned and, faced with death at the hands of a vengeful Drax, he activated a distress beacon that he had secretly salvaged from the wreck — summoning another ship and surrendering himself to the authorities who had previously imprisoned him.

Annihilation

Paibok later reappears fighting for Annihilus and his allies, as part of the Annihilation Wave. Following the death of Annihilus, the parasites injected into Paibok to force his obedience cease functioning. He briefly joins forces with Terrax the Tamer and the Delinquent to kill Randau the Space Parasite, a being that had been slaughtering innocents. After the battle, which ends with the destruction of the planet by Terrax, he convinces the addled Delinquent to craft a spaceship. They return to what remains of the Skrull Empire.

All-New, All-Different Marvel
As part of the All-New, All-Different Marvel, Paibok appears as a member of the Maker's New Revengers.<ref>New Avengers vol. 4 #6. Marvel Comics.</ref>

Powers and abilities
As a Skrull, Paibok possesses heightened physical malleability, an innate racial ability to shapeshift. Paibok is a graduate from the Skrull military academy, as well as an expert in all forms of armed and unarmed combat known to his own species. He can access to advanced technology, such as warp drive starships or ranged energy weapons. Paibok has a set of additional powers, thanks to bionic re-engineering by Skrull scientists. He also possesses immense strength, stamina, durability, speed, and agility, supersonic flight, organic metal transformation, cryokinesis, electrokinesis, and hypnotism. Paibok wears body armor of unspecified materials.

In other media
Paibok appears as a mini-boss in the video game Marvel: Ultimate Alliance'', voiced by Khary Payton. He appears during a mission when the player must visit the Skrull homeworld that is under attack by Galactus. Initially, the player can choose either the Super-Skrull or Paibok to act as bodyguards while opening the doors for the Skrull Empress' spaceship to escape. The only exception is if your team is composed of the Fantastic Four in which case they do not trust either Paibok or the Super-Skrull. Afterwards, the Skrull Empress then orders Paibok and the Super-Skrull to kill the heroes while she escapes. A simulation disk has the Human Torch fighting Paibok and a VS simulation disk has the heroes fighting Paibok.

References

External links
 
 Paibok at Marvel.com

Characters created by Tom DeFalco
Comics characters introduced in 1991
Fictional hypnotists and indoctrinators
Fictional impostors
Fictional characters with electric or magnetic abilities
Fictional characters with ice or cold abilities
Fictional characters with slowed ageing
Fictional characters with superhuman durability or invulnerability
Marvel Comics characters who can move at superhuman speeds
Marvel Comics characters with superhuman strength
Marvel Comics extraterrestrial supervillains
Marvel Comics male supervillains
Marvel Comics military personnel
Marvel Comics mutates
Marvel Comics supervillains
Skrull